Avengers Campus is a Marvel Cinematic Universe–themed area located at Disney California Adventure and Walt Disney Studios Park in Disneyland Paris, and being developed for Hong Kong Disneyland. The Marvel-themed areas or "lands" are being developed simultaneously at the three parks and inspired by the Marvel Cinematic Universe. However, they instead take place in the "Marvel Theme Park Universe", an alternate universe parallel to it within the Marvel multiverse, in which the Blip and related ensuing events introduced in Avengers: Infinity War did not occur. They are designed by Walt Disney Imagineering, in collaboration with Marvel Studios and Marvel Themed Entertainment.

These three parks all hosted a Marvel-themed seasonal event in the past, which confirmed the demand for the integration of Marvel characters in the parks.

Based on three different continents, the Marvel-themed areas will be defined as the "Super Hero campus" of their specific region, that will help guests to become heroes. Each area will feature mostly different sets of attractions and entertainment, while being strongly interconnected with each other by sharing a common narrative.

Disney California Adventure
Avengers Campus at Disney California Adventure is centered around an Avengers campus located on the former shared grounds of a Stark Industries plant and Strategic Scientific Reserve complex. The area takes up the space previously occupied by A Bug's Land—with Web Slingers: A Spider-Man Adventure using the same show building that previously housed the It's Tough to Be a Bug! attraction—as well as absorbing the nearby Guardians of the Galaxy – Mission: Breakout! attraction that was previously designated in Hollywood Land.

A Bug's Land closed on September 5, 2018, to make way for the new area. At the 2017 D23 Expo, Disney announced the Guardians of the Galaxy attraction would be joined by Spider-Man and the Avengers as part of the new immersive superhero-themed area at the park. Disney initially announced on March 11, 2020, that Avengers Campus would open on July 18, 2020, but was delayed due to the theme parks being shut down caused by the COVID-19 pandemic and two stay at home orders issued by California Governor Gavin Newsom. In late December 2020, Disney announced that Avengers Campus was scheduled to open in 2021. Due to a 1994 contract with Universal Parks & Resorts, Disney cannot use the "Marvel" name in the park's branding or attractions. In April 2021, Disney announced that the area would open on June 4, 2021.

On February 28, 2022, to honor Stan Lee, the park dedicated a plaque by an entrance to the Campus surrounded by blue planters as Lee would have celebrated his 100th Birthday in December 2022. The plaque's inscription reads: "We dedicate Avengers Campus to the incomparable Stan Lee. 'That person who helps others simply because it should or must be done and because it's the right thing to do, is indeed without a doubt a real superhero.' Thank you, Stan, for inspiring the hero within each of us. You have made us all True Believers."

Current attractions and entertainment
 Guardians of the Galaxy – Mission: Breakout!
Guardians of the Galaxy – Monsters After Dark (seasonal)
 Guardians of the Galaxy – Awesome Dance Off!
 Heroic Encounters
 Web Slingers: A Spider-Man Adventure
 Doctor Strange: Mysteries of the Mystic Arts
 Avengers Headquarters

Future attractions and entertainment
 Unnamed multiverse-focused Avengers attraction

Restaurants
 Pym Test Kitchen
 Pym Tasting Lab
 Shawarma Palace
 Terran Treats

Retail 
 The Collector's Warehouse
 WEB Suppliers
 Campus Supply Pod

Meet and Greet: Heroes and Villains 
Many of the meet and greet characters appearances are timed to the release of their associated film or television project.

 Bruce Banner / Hulk / Smart Hulk
 Clint Barton / Hawkeye
 Kate Bishop / Hawkeye
 Elsa Bloodstone
 Characters from the Disney Television Animation series Marvel's Moon Girl and Devil Dinosaur (February 2023, in honor of Black History Month)
 America Chavez
 Carol Danvers / Captain Marvel
 Death Dealer
 Antonia Dreykov / Taskmaster
 Dora Milaje
 Jane Foster / Mighty Thor
 Gamora
 Groot / Baby Groot
 Agatha Harkness
 Kamala Khan / Ms. Marvel
 Kingo
 Scott Lang / Ant-Man
 Cassie Lang / Stature
 Loki
 Wanda Maximoff / Scarlet Witch
 M'Baku
 Okoye
 Kang the Conqueror
 Peter Parker / Spider-Man
 Phastos
 Peter Quill / Star-Lord
 Steve Rogers / Captain America
 Natasha Romanoff / Black Widow
 Jack Russell / Werewolf by Night
 Sersi
 Shang-Chi
 Shuri / Black Panther
 Marc Spector / Moon Knight
 Steven Grant / Mr. Knight
 Tony Stark / Iron Man
 Dr. Stephen Strange
 T'Challa / Black Panther
 Thor
 Hope van Dyne / Wasp
 Sam Wilson / Captain America

Related 
 Rogers: The Musical – one-act production of the fictional musical, to be performed at the Hyperion Theater in the adjacent Hollywood Land area for a limited time beginning in mid-2023

Walt Disney Studios Park
The version at Walt Disney Studios Park (Disneyland Paris) exists on the former Backlot area of the park. It includes Avengers Assemble: Flight Force (a re-theme of the park's opening day attraction Rock 'n' Roller Coaster Starring Aerosmith that features Iron Man and Captain Marvel) and Web Slingers: A Spider-Man Adventure from California, now titled as Spider-Man W.E.B. Adventure. The area opened on July 20, 2022.

Attractions and entertainment
 Avengers Assemble: Flight Force
 Spider-Man W.E.B. Adventure
 Training Center
 Heroic Encounters

In the Training Center, guests can meet Spider-Man, Iron Man, or other Marvel characters. The experience features a dynamic “freeze frame” video sequence, created with Disney Photo Pass through 27 cameras placed around the area.

Dining
 Pym Kitchen
 Stark Factory
 Super Diner
 WEB - Worldwide Eating Brigade
 FANtastic Food Truck

Retail
 Mission Equipment

Hong Kong Disneyland
The version at Hong Kong Disneyland was announced in 2016, as part of the park's expansion plan. It will take over part of Tomorrowland and will be themed as the Stark Expo based in Hong Kong, where guests are asked to join the Super Heroes in their battles. This version entered phase 2 in 2019, which includes Ant-Man and The Wasp: Nano Battle! in the Science and Technology Pavilion of Stark Expo, along with a new retail facility and themed food. This new attraction joined the Iron Man Experience, which opened in 2017 and took up the area where the former Buzz Lightyear Astro Blasters attraction used to be. On top of this, there will be new attractions and other forms of entertainment added to the land up until the year 2023, when a brand new Avengers themed ride will open, taking over the area previously occupied by Autopia.

Current attractions and entertainment (as part of Tomorrowland)
 Ant-Man and The Wasp: Nano Battle!
 Expo Assembly Station - Heroic Encounter
 Guardians of the Galaxy: Awesome Dance Off!
 Iron Man Experience
 Iron Man Tech Showcase

Current retail (as part of Tomorrowland)
 Expo Shop
 Pavilion Gifts

Future attractions and entertainment
 Avengers Quinjet Experience

Future restaurant
 Stark Expo themed Restaurant

Music 
The music for the themed land at Disney California Adventure was arranged by John Paesano, who referenced themes from the MCU's Avengers, Spider-Man, Doctor Strange, Guardians of the Galaxy, Ant-Man, Captain Marvel, and Black Panther films. A single entitled "Welcome Recruits" was digitally released by Hollywood Records and Marvel Music on April 22, 2022.

See also

 Marvel Super Hero Island
 Guardians of the Galaxy: Cosmic Rewind
 The Amazing Adventures of Spider-Man
 The Incredible Hulk Coaster
 Star Wars: Galaxy's Edge
 Pandora – The World of Avatar

Notes

References

External links

 Official Disney California Adventure website
 Official Walt Disney Studios Park website

2021 establishments in California
2022 establishments in France
 
Avengers (film series)
Disney California Adventure
Hong Kong Disneyland
Marvel Cinematic Universe amusement rides
Themed areas in Walt Disney Parks and Resorts
Amusement attractions under construction
Walt Disney Studios Park